Elections for the City of Edinburgh District Council took place on Thursday 5 May 1988, alongside elections to the councils of Scotland's various other districts.

Labour had won control of the Council for the first time ever in the previous elections, and managed to retain its control. Voter turnout was 53.2%, up from 47.6% in the previous elections.

Aggregate results

References

1988
1988 Scottish local elections
1980s in Edinburgh